Hugh Bethell may refer to: 

Hugh Bethell (died 1679) (1615–1679), English Member of Parliament (MP) for East Riding and Hedon
Hugh Bethell (died 1717) English MP for Hedon, son of above
Hugh Bethell (died 1747) English MP for Pontefract
Hugh Bethell (died 1772) English MP for Beverley
Hugh Bethell (British Army officer) (1882–1947), British general

See also
Bethell